This article is about the particular significance of the year 1777 to Wales and its people.

Incumbents
Lord Lieutenant of Anglesey - Sir Nicholas Bayly, 2nd Baronet
Lord Lieutenant of Brecknockshire and Monmouthshire – Charles Morgan of Dderw
Lord Lieutenant of Caernarvonshire - Thomas Wynn
Lord Lieutenant of Cardiganshire – Wilmot Vaughan, 1st Earl of Lisburne
Lord Lieutenant of Carmarthenshire – George Rice
Lord Lieutenant of Denbighshire - Richard Myddelton  
Lord Lieutenant of Flintshire - Sir Roger Mostyn, 5th Baronet 
Lord Lieutenant of Glamorgan – John Stuart, Lord Mountstuart
Lord Lieutenant of Merionethshire - Sir Watkin Williams-Wynn, 4th Baronet (from 10 June)
Lord Lieutenant of Montgomeryshire – George Herbert, 2nd Earl of Powis
Lord Lieutenant of Pembrokeshire – Sir Hugh Owen, 5th Baronet
Lord Lieutenant of Radnorshire – Edward Harley, 4th Earl of Oxford and Earl Mortimer

Bishop of Bangor – John Moore
Bishop of Llandaff – Shute Barrington
Bishop of St Asaph – Jonathan Shipley
Bishop of St Davids – James Yorke

Events
1 March - David Samwell, at sea between New Zealand and Tahiti with Captain Cook, writes a pennillion.
22 July - The business partnership between Anthony Bacon and William Brownrigg is dissolved.
Thomas Pennant marries, as his second wife, Anne Mostyn, daughter of Sir Thomas Mostyn, 4th Baronet.
Francis Towne and John White go on a painting tour of North Wales.

Arts and literature

New books
Evan Hughes (Hughes Fawr) - Duwdod Crist
Nicholas Owen - British Remains
Thomas Pennant - British Zoology, vol. 4
William Williams Pantycelyn - Ductor Naptiarum: Neu Gyfarwyddwr Priodas

Music
Harpist Edward Jones performs at Covent Garden.

Births
15 June - David Daniel Davis, royal obstetrician (died 1841)
29 August - John James, hymn-writer (died 1848)
15 September - John Jones of Ystrad, MP (died 1842)
7 November - Richard Bassett, Methodist minister (died 1852)
date unknown
William Camden Edwards, engraver (died 1855)
Thomas Rees, Unitarian minister (died 1864)

Deaths
4 March - Edward Richard, teacher and poet, 62
5 April - Thomas Lewis, politician, 86
April - John Hodges, Methodist, 77
19 May - Button Gwinnett, American political leader of Welsh parentage, 41 (killed in duel)
28 June - Chase Price, lawyer and politician, 45/6
1 July - Sir John Glynne, 6th Baronet, 64
30 August - Dafydd Jones, hymn-writer, 66
18 December - William Lloyd, translator, 60
23 December - Thomas Farnolls Pritchard, architect who worked in the borders of Wales and England, about 54

References

Wales
Wales